is a railway station on the Hokuriku Railroad Asanogawa Line in the town of  Uchinada, Japan, operated by the private railway operator Hokuriku Railroad (Hokutetsu).

Lines

Station layout
The station consists of one side platform serving a single bi-directional track.

Adjacent stations

History
Awagasaki Station opened on 14 July 1929.

Surrounding area
 Asahigaoka Community Center
 Sugahara Shrine

See also
 List of railway stations in Japan

External links

  

Railway stations in Ishikawa Prefecture
Railway stations in Japan opened in 1929
Hokuriku Railroad Asanogawa Line
Uchinada, Ishikawa